Alnus cremastogyne is a species of flowering plant in the genus Alnus. It is found in China.

References

External links
 

cremastogyne